The 2003–04 season was the 101st competitive season in Belgian football.

National team
Belgium ended their qualifying campaign for the 2004 UEFA European Championship at the third place in Group 8 and thus did not take part to the final tournament.

* Belgium score given first

Key
 H = Home match
 A = Away match
 F = Friendly
 ECQ = UEFA European Championship 2004 Qualifying, Group 8
 og = own goal

Honours

Final tables

Jupiler League

Second division

See also
 Belgian First Division 2003-04
 2003 Belgian Super Cup
 Belgian Second Division
 Belgian Third Division: divisions A and B
 Belgian Promotion: divisions A, B, C and D

References
 FA website - International results
 www.sport.be - 2nd division final table

 
Seasons in Belgian football
Belgium
Foot
Foot